Les Clouzeaux is a former commune of the Vendée department in the Pays de la Loire region in western France. On 1 January 2016, it was merged into the new commune of Aubigny-Les Clouzeaux. Its male inhabitants are called Cluzéliens, and Cluzéliennes for the female ones.

See also
Communes of the Vendée department

References

Former communes of Vendée